Sufi Hasan (also Romanized as Şūfī Ḩasan) is a village in Almalu Rural District, Nazarkahrizi District, Hashtrud County, East Azerbaijan Province, Iran. At the 2006 census, its population was 68, in 9 families.

References 

Towns and villages in Hashtrud County